Tilling can mean:

 Tillage, an agricultural preparation of the soil.
 TILLING (molecular biology)
 Tilling is a fictional town in the Mapp and Lucia novels of E. F. Benson.
 Tilling Green, Ledshire, is a fictional village in Patricia Wentworth's Miss Silver novel, Poison in the Pen.
 The Tilling Group, once a major British bus company and later a conglomerate.
 Thomas Tilling was Cockney rhyming slang for a shilling.
 People with the surname Tilling
 Roger Tilling, a British broadcaster
 Thomas Tilling, founder of the Tilling Group
 Tilling slang when someone rubs someone else behind, in a circular motion for a long period of time